Ogana Ugochukwu Louis (born 29 December 1995),  is a Nigerian professional footballer who plays as a forward for I-League club Sreenidi Deccan.

Club career
On 30 September 2015, Louis made his professional debut with Braga B in a 2015–16 LigaPro match against Sporting Covilhã.

On 19 February 2018, he joined FK Žalgiris, scoring 11 goals during his only season with the club, leaving at the end of the season.

On 28 February 2019, Ararat-Armenia announced the signing of Louis. On 15 January 2021, Ararat-Armenia confirmed that Louis had left the club after his contract had expired.

Sreenidi Deccan
On 2 February 2022, Louis joined Indian club Sreenidi Deccan, one of the new I-League entrants.

He made his debut for the club, on 3 March 2022, against TRAU in a 3–1 win, in which he scored a goal. After finishing fourth in group stage with six wins in twelve matches, they moved to the championship stage. At the end, the club finished their maiden league campaign in third place with 32 points in 18 matches, and won the last match against Churchill Brothers on 14 May.

Career statistics

Club

Honours
Ararat-Armenia
 Armenian Premier League (2): 2018–19, 2019–20
 Armenian Supercup (1): 2019

Individual
A Lyga Team of the Year: 2018

References

External links

Stats and profile at LPFP 

1995 births
Living people
Nigerian footballers
Nigerian expatriate footballers
Association football forwards
Liga Portugal 2 players
A Lyga players
Armenian Premier League players
S.C. Braga B players
FK Žalgiris players
FC Ararat-Armenia players
Expatriate footballers in Portugal
Expatriate footballers in Lithuania
Expatriate footballers in Armenia
Sreenidi Deccan FC players
Nigerian expatriate sportspeople in India
Expatriate footballers in India
I-League players